Karachay-Cherkessia (presented at the 2013 and 2014 contests as Kabardino-Balkaria and Karachay-Cherkessia) are one of the twenty-four participating countries and regions who competed in the first Turkvision Song Contest between 17 and 21 December 2013.

History
Karachay-Cherkessia made their joint debut in the Turkvision Song Contest at the  festival, in Eskişehir, Turkey. They selected their participant alongside Kabardino-Balkaria on 1 December 2013, a national selection was held in the Karachay-Cherkessia Capital Cherkessk at the Avenue Restaurant, a total of 12 artists competed, the winner was Eldar Zhanikaev with "Adamdı bizni atıbız" (Имя тебе-человек). The contest in 2013 was broadcast on channel 9 The Wave as Elbrusoid the organiser of the nations participation is not a television station.

On 20 July 2014 it was announced that Karachay-Cherkessia would make their second appearance at the Turkvision Song Contest 2014 to be held in Kazan, Tatarstan in November 2014. It was announced that an open national selection would be held, songs would be submitted to the Ministry of Culture of Kabardino-Balkaria and Karachay-Cherkessia, with the songs going on to perform in a selection in Cherkessk. It was announced that online voting would help select the winner, however due to low submissions this did not occur. The final took place on 28 September 2014, 10 artists competed, Eldar Zhanikaev was selected with the song "Barama" (Барама).

Participation overview

See also
 Russia in the Turkvision Song Contest

References 

Turkvision
Countries in the Turkvision Song Contest